André Davis (born 1979) is a former American football wide receiver.

Andre Davis may also refer to:

 Andre M. Davis (born 1949), American judge
 Andre Davis (wide receiver, born 1993), American football player
 Andre Davis (defensive tackle)

See also
 Andra Davis (born 1978), former American football player
 Davis (surname)
 List of people with surname Davis